Radiation is a process in which a body emits energy that propagates through a medium or through empty space, but is absorbed by other bodies. Radiation may also refer to:

Physics 
 Electromagnetic radiation, radiation that takes the form of a self-propagating wave of electric and magnetic fields, 
Particular wavelength bands of full electromagnetic spectrum, such as gamma rays, radio waves, visible light
Thermal radiation, electromagnetic radiation that emanates from every object above absolute zero in proportion to the fourth power of its temperature
Synchrotron radiation (also called a synchrotron light source), electromagnetic radiation generated by the acceleration of fast moving charged particles through magnetic fields
 Gravitational radiation, radiation that takes the form of gravitational waves, or ripples in the curvature of spacetime.
 Ionizing radiation, radiation that is of high enough energy to cause atoms to lose or gain electrons, rendering molecules, such as proteins, incapable of functioning
 Nuclear radiation, radiation, especially ionizing radiation, that emanates from nuclear processes such as radioactive decay
 Acoustic radiation, which takes the form of mechanical waves in a physical transmission medium, such as ultrasound, sound, and seismic waves

Medicine 
 Radiation therapy, also called radiotherapy, a medical treatment that involves exposing part or all of the body to a controlled amount of ionizing radiation
 Optic or acoustic radiations, signal pathway structures of human brain white matter in the visual and auditory systems

Evolutionary biology 
 Evolutionary radiation, a diversification into several lineages from a common ancestor
 Adaptive radiation, an evolutionary radiation to fill many ecological niches

Music and arts 
 Radiation (album), released in 1998, the tenth studio album by the British progressive rock band Marillion
 Roddy Radiation, stage name of Roddy Byers (born 1955), English musician
 A pseudonym of Toby Fox, composer for the webcomic Homestuck, and creator of the video game Undertale
 "Radiation", a 1997 song by Feeder, from the album Polythene

Other 
 Radiation, Inc., now Harris Corporation